The Works Recording Studio was a recording studio located in Stockport, Greater Manchester, UK between 1998 and 2007.  Built in a Victorian rectory it was originally an analogue studio  used by unsigned bands and fading stars of Manchester's rich musical scene including ex-members of  The Smiths and The Stone Roses. In 2001 it installed a Pro Tools system, and then recorded albums for bands such as Amplifier, Oceansize, Inertia Blooms and Performance. In 2005 there was a bizarre 3 a.m. appearance by U.S. rap star Snoop Dogg who visited the studio after playing a concert, bringing an entourage of musicians, enormous bodyguards and a chef. The studio also branched out into making music videos. In 2007 "Super Producer"  Timbaland used the studio whilst on tour with Justin Timberlake.

Buildings and structures in Stockport
Recording studios in Greater Manchester
Music in Manchester
Organisations based in Stockport